Stephane Bonnes (born February 26, 1978 in Mulhouse, France) is a former footballer who played for Mulhouse F.C, Celtic, Partick Thistle and Saint-Louis-Neuweg. Bonnes was signed for Celtic by John Barnes on 29 July 1999 but despite scoring in a pre-season game against HamKam, he never played a single first team game.

He moved to Partick Thistle on 9 June 2003 and spent one season with the club, making 24 appearances and scoring twice. His goals came against Hamilton Academical in the Scottish Cup and Kilmarnock in the league.

References

External links

Living people
1978 births
French footballers
French expatriate footballers
FC Mulhouse players
Scottish Premier League players
Celtic F.C. players
Partick Thistle F.C. players
Expatriate footballers in Scotland
Footballers from Mulhouse
Association football midfielders
French expatriate sportspeople in Scotland